The Simon Fraser Student Society (SFSS) is the students' union of Simon Fraser University in Metro Vancouver, Canada. It was founded after the opening of Simon Fraser University in 1967.

The SFSS consists of over 26,000 students with an annual budget of over one million dollars. Membership is mandatory and all SFU undergraduate students members are charged fees collected by the university on behalf of the SFSS. The organization employs both permanent and student staff at their location on the second level of the Maggie Benston Centre on SFU's Burnaby Campus. The student society also has an office and provides services at the satellite campus of SFU Surrey with Shelley Durante as the sole staff operating there. The SFSS has completed the construction of the Student Union Building and Stadium project on the Burnaby campus in August 2020. Together, the two structures are called Build SFU.

The SFSS offers services such as a Women's Centre and an LGBTQ+ Centre on the Burnaby campus. The society distributes dayplanners as well as providing legal clinics and funding for departments' student unions, campus clubs, social events, academic events and political groups.

Structure

The Simon Fraser Student Society's Board of Directors produces a website that declares the Board the Society's sole decision-making body and presents Council (formerly  "Forum") and a variety of committees as advisory bodies. Historically, Council/Forum has been the Society's decision-making body, with the Board split off from Forum in 2000.

Before 2002, Forum (now "Council") was the Society's decision-making body. Council is composed of elected representatives from all of the Departmental Student Unions and the constituent groups (Out On Campus, Women's Centre, First Nations, Métis & Inuit Student Association, Students of Caribbean & African Ancestry, Residence Hall Association, and Disability and Neurodiversity Alliance). The Board of Directors are Honorary Members of Forum as per the constitution of the Society. Following the concentration of power in the Board, Council is responsible for advising the Board on a variety of issues relevant to students and acts as a watchdog of the Board.

The Board of Directors is composed entirely of representatives elected directly by students. The Board is responsible for and exercises full control over the affairs of the Society. In addition, it is the only recognized medium of communication between its members, the University, and the general public. The Board meets bi-weekly year-round.

Since the creation of the SFSS in 1967, it has represented graduate and undergraduate students with one Society.
However, during the Spring 2007 election, Graduate Students voted to form their own society separate from the SFSS. This is the Graduate Students Society (GSS) at Simon Fraser University. The start date for full separation was May 1, 2008.

Like many student unions in BC, the SFSS also relies heavily on a permanent staff. They hold various bureaucratic positions, help assist board members, and in some cases assist in the development of policy. SFSS staff are members of the Canadian Union of Public Employees Local 3338 after a merger from Local 5396.

History
Since its founding in 1967, the organization has been highly politicized. Main campaigns have centered around opposing tuition fee increases, increasing student financial assistance, and advocating for greater uptake of open educational resources (OER). In addition to this, the Society has campaigned for student-dominated university decision-making, academic freedom, improved student services, social democracy, women's rights, gay rights, First Nations, the disabled, and international students. The society's membership in the Canadian Federation of Students has been an enormous controversy.

After a long and highly publicized legal battle, the students voted at referendum in 2011 to leave the CFS and re-allocate the mandatory fees back into the SFSS to provide students with more services.

In 2005, members voted in favour of a graduate health and dental plan. The Student Society began providing health and dental plan services to graduate students in September 2005. In 2007, graduate students voted to separate from the SFSS and establish the Graduate Student Society at Simon Fraser University, which now provides these services.

Controversies

Student health plan
In 1996, the organization imposed a mandatory health plan to the student population after passing a referendum question during an earlier election.  The health plan sparked much controversy on campus. A group of students started a campaign to dissolve the student society, drastically reduce the student society membership fees, withdraw from the Canadian Federation of Students, and eliminate the health plan.  A student petition resulted in having three referendum questions decided in the 1997 general election. Of the three referendum questions, only the referendum question on axing the health plan passed.

Quorum
Until recently, a quorum of 500 members was required to make any changes to the Student Society's bylaws and constitution at the Society's annual general meeting (AGM). As the university has approximately 28,000 students, this means that only 2% of student population is needed to make wide-reaching changes with regards to the SFSS. Despite the seemingly low requirement, quorum has been unattainable most years. In 2005, this led the Society to propose a change to the bylaw for quorum from 500 to 100, which ultimately failed.

In the fall 2003 semester, the Society spent $15,000 hosting a free dinner for students to encourage turnout at the annual general meeting to achieve quorum.  Although the quorum of 500 was met, students left part-way through the meeting, causing the meeting to lose quorum.  As a result, no voting was done, and an outcry ensued from students for allegedly wasting student fees. The 2006 special general meeting (see "Impeachment") marks the first time quorum has been effectively reached in 10 years.

On 10 October 2007, members of the Simon Fraser Student Society achieved the quorum of over 500 at the annual general meeting; three major by-laws changes occurred. Graduate students, who had previously voted for full independence in March, are no longer be members of the Simon Fraser Student Society as of September 2008. Graduate students were the majority of attendees and had an interest in the above amendment, shown by their unusually high turnout. A motion to lower quorum from 500 to 250 passed with 77%, and another resolution passed giving members of the society the ability to vote on future by-law changes by referendums as well as at general meetings.

Impeachment
In July 2006, the Board of Directors directed seven full-time staff members to go on leave with pay and benefits to complete an investigation into internal issues. The investigation lasted a total of 5 working days. Society keys and email passwords were confiscated and computers were searched. Staff were directed not to enter SFSS property until directed otherwise.  In August, a staff member was fired as a result of the investigation. Directors have outlined in Board meetings on July 26, August 9, and August 23 that they are bound by confidentiality in their collective agreement with CUPE 5396, and cannot disclose the justifications for terminating the employee. However, they have iterated that they had just cause and that they are prepared to go to arbitration. These Directors later illegally disclosed the supposed reason during classroom speaking sessions which was recorded as part of the regular lecture recording. A 2007 article in 'Upping the Anti' quotes "an elected officer of the SFSS" as having stated to a colleague that "'[w]e don’t trust her" because "[s]he attempted to bring speculation upon the CFS at the CFS conference in May by publicly asking inappropriate questions during some of the meetings.'" The fired employer was later reinstated and arbitration results included a full retroactive pay.

An organisation called Students for a Democratic University instigated a petition for a special general meeting under the SFSS's bylaws and the Society Act of British Columbia that called for the impeachment of seven directors and two bylaw changes that would alter funding and decision-making authority within the SFSS. The petition had signatures from 9.8% of all students, exceeding the 5% required to call a meeting, according to an SFSS bylaw. Despite this, the directors up for impeachment insisted the petition was insufficient, quoting the Society Act, which says a meeting must be called if 10% sign a petition.

A special general meeting (called by Forum) of the SFSS was held on October 25, 2006 in the school's Convocation Mall. 1028 students attended overall (up to 760 at the same time) the Special General Meeting, and voted in favour of motions to impeach the seven directors and to two amendments to the bylaws of the society.

In response, the seven directors claimed that the special general meeting was invalid by claiming the Forum meeting used to call the special general meeting itself was invalid, and issued guidelines to the staff of the society. They asked the Supreme Court of British Columbia to declare the impeachments invalid. The bank account of the SFSS was frozen due to the controversy over who were the legitimate directors of the SFSS. This issue was resolved on November 23, 2006 with a court order enforcing an agreement between the impeached directors and the remaining directors.

While President Shawn Hunsdale has resigned after his impeachment, he maintained his claim that the special general meeting that impeached him is invalid. The President of the University itself, Michael Stevenson, stated that until the Supreme Court of BC made a decision, students, as well as the impeached directors, should respect the SGM.

In December 2006, the BC Supreme Court ruled that the special general meeting and impeachment were legitimate and there was no issue with the Forum. The court also stated that in the event that there was a problem with the Forum, the petition was sufficient and should have been followed, and assigned all costs to the individual impeached directors.

Canadian Federation of Students
In March 2007 the Simon Fraser Student Society conducted a non-binding plebiscite where over 75% of voting members voted to leave the CFS. The power of this plebiscite to give a clear mandate was questioned by some. The referendum was held in conjunction with the general election of 2007.

After this plebiscite the SFSS engaged in the regular defederation process, collecting over 3000 signatures during the summer semester for a defederation vote six months hence.

In the vote, which was held in March 2008, students again voted to leave by a 66% majority.

The status of the 2008 referendum remains disputed by both parties, with the SFSS maintaining it is no longer a member of the CFS and the CFS maintaining that it is. Both the CFS and SFSS petitioned the courts to have their arguments legally upheld. SFSS has since recommended to other student governments that they avoid membership within the Canadian Federation of Students. As of December 2011, the Simon Fraser Student Society and the CFS have reached an out of court resolution. As part of the resolution, it was agreed that membership had ended (Source: SFSS website ).

See also
List of British Columbia students' associations
Simon Fraser University

References

External links

GSS Website

British Columbia students' associations
Student